Ferrero Bay is a body of water about  wide, lying immediately west of Cosgrove Ice Shelf and occupying the outer (west) part of the embayment between King Peninsula and Canisteo Peninsula. It was mapped from air photos taken by U.S. Navy Operation Highjump in December 1946, and was named by the Advisory Committee on Antarctic Names for Lieutenant Commander H. H. Ferrero, communications officer on the staff of the Commander, U.S. Navy Support Force, Antarctica, 1966–68.

Further reading 
 Majewski, Wojciech. (2013), Benthic foraminifera from Pine Island and Ferrero bays, Amundsen Sea, Polish Polar Research. 34. 10.2478/popore-2013-0012
 Minzoni, R. T., Majewski, W., Anderson, J. B., Yokoyama, Y., Fernandez, R., & Jakobsson, M. (2017), Oceanographic influences on the stability of the Cosgrove Ice Shelf, Antarctica, The Holocene, 27(11), 1645–1658. https://doi.org/10.1177/0959683617702226
 Minzoni, R. T.; Anderson, J. B.; Majewski, W.; Yokoyama, Y.; Fernandez, R.; Jakobsson, M., Oceanographic Influences on Ice Shelves and Drainage in the Amundsen Sea, American Geophysical Union, Fall Meeting 2016, abstract #C41B-0664
 Thomas B. Kellogg  Davida E. Kellogg, Recent glacial history and rapid ice stream retreat in the Amundsen Sea ,  https://doi.org/10.1029/JB092iB09p08859

External links 

 Ferrero Bay on USGS website
 Ferrero Bay on AADC website
 Ferrero Bay on SCAR website
 Ferrero Bay on marineregions.org

References 

Bays of Ellsworth Land